Middle Guinea refers to a region in central Guinea, corresponding roughly with the plateau region known as Futa Jalon.

It is bounded by Maritime Guinea, also known as Lower Guinea, to the west, Guinea Bissau to the northwest, Senegal to the north, Upper Guinea to the east, and Sierra Leone to the south.
Regions of Guinea

See also
Lower Guinea
Upper Guinea

References 

Geography of Guinea